Shibarm (also Romanized as Shībarm) is a village in Bord Khun Rural District, Bord Khun District, Deyr County, Bushehr Province, Iran. At the 2006 census, its population was 31, in 7 families.

References 

Populated places in Deyr County